Subscapular means the area of the human back under the scapula. 
It may refer to:

Subscapular artery
Upper subscapular nerve
Lower subscapular nerve
Subscapularis muscle